Dudi Sela won the tournament after defeating Jérémy Chardy 6–4, 3–6, 7–5 in the final.

Seeds

Draw

Finals

Top half

Bottom half

References
 Main Draw
 Qualifying Draw

Nottingham Challenge - Singles
2011 Men's Singles